Timothy Carl Beamer (born April 6, 1948) is an American former football defensive back who played in the National Football League for the Buffalo Bills for 12 games in 1971.

References

Living people
1948 births
Buffalo Bills players
African-American players of American football
American football defensive backs
Illinois Fighting Illini football players
People from Galax, Virginia
Players of American football from Virginia